QRL is a three letter acronym that can stand for several things:
Quantum Resistance Ledger, a blockchain solution utilizing quantum Resistance encryption
The Queen's Royal Lancers, an armoured regiment of the British Army 
Queensland Rugby League, the governing body of rugby league football in the Australian state of Queensland
QRL, one of the Q codes used in radiocommunication, meaning "I am busy"
A QR Code with a URL (web site address) encoded within it